USS Sabik (AK-121) was a  commissioned by the U.S. Navy for service in World War II. She was responsible for delivering troops, goods and equipment to locations in the war zone.

Ship built in Houston, Texas 

Sabik was laid down as SS William Becknell (MCE hull 2423) on 8 November 1943 by the Todd-Houston Shipbuilding Corp., Houston, Texas; renamed Sabik on 13 November; launched on 17 December; sponsored by Mrs. Johnnie L. Armstrong; accepted by WSA for United States Navy use on 29 December and moved to New Orleans, Louisiana, to undergo conversion by Todd-Johnson Dry Docks, Inc.; and commissioned on 19 April 1944.

World War II Pacific Theatre operations 
 
Following shakedown off Norfolk, Virginia, Sabik proceeded to Bayonne, New Jersey, where she loaded cargo and marines and sailed on 5 June for the New Hebrides. She arrived at Espiritu Santo on 13 July and then continued on to the Russell Islands, commencing a schedule of inter-island shuttle runs that ranged the southwestern Pacific Ocean during the course of the war.

Island-hopping in the South Pacific 

For nearly 15 months, the cargo ship plied the waters between Guadalcanal, Tulagi, Munda, the Russells, the New Hebrides, Bougainville, Peleliu, Anguar, Ulithi, Eniwetok, Manus, Hollandia, Guam, Saipan, and Tinian. She participated in landings, during this time, at the Tacloban and Dulag beaches on Leyte, and at the Hagushi beaches on Okinawa. She finally sailed for Pearl Harbor on 29 July 1945, arriving on 13 August. She then proceeded to San Francisco, California, passing under the Golden Gate bridge on 22 August.

End-of-war activity 
 
Following long needed repairs, Sabik departed the Mare Island Naval Shipyard on 24 September en route to Guam and Majuro for Operation Magic Carpet duty. Returning troops to the United States, she returned to San Francisco exactly three months later on 24 December and remained there to await inactivation.

Post-war decommissioning 

Sabik decommissioned on 19 March 1946 and was returned to WSA the same day for lay-up at Suisun Bay, California. Struck from the Navy List on 17 April 1946, the ship resumed her original name, SS William Becknell, and remained in the National Defense Reserve Fleet until sold for scrapping on 30 October 1961 to Union Minerals and Alloys Corp., New York City, New York.

Military awards and honors 

Sabik earned two battle stars for World War II service:
 Leyte operation (Leyte landings, Tacloban and Dulag, October and November 1944)
 Okinawa Gunto operation (Assault and occupation of Okinawa Gunto, November 1944 to January 1945)
Her crew was eligible for the following medals:
 American Campaign Medal
 Asiatic-Pacific Campaign Medal (2)
 World War II Victory Medal
 Philippines Liberation Medal (1)

References

External links
 

Crater-class cargo ships
World War II auxiliary ships of the United States
Ships built in Houston
1943 ships